Following is a list of the chapters of Alpha Kappa Lambda. Active chapters and indicated in bold. Inactive chapters are in italic.

Notes

References 

Lists of chapters of United States student societies by society